Paper Doll is the 20th Spenser novel by Robert B. Parker. The story follows the Boston-based PI Spenser as he tries to solve the apparently random killing of the well-regarded wife of a local businessman.

Plot
The novel's hero is Spenser, a private investigator in Boston. Spenser, who served as an infantryman in the 1st Infantry Division during the Korean War and as a former State trooper, is hired by Boston aristocrat Loudon Tripp to investigate his wife's murder, and Spenser soon uncovers upper-class scandals and a corpse who might not be dead after all.

Recurring characters
Spenser
Hawk
Dr. Susan Silverman, Ph.D
Lt. Martin Quirk, Boston Police Department
Sgt. Frank Belson, Boston Police Department
Detective Lee Farrell
Wayne Cosgrove
Henry Cimoli

Mentioned but not seen
Paul Giacomin
Vinnie Morris

References

1993 American novels
Spenser (novel series)
G. P. Putnam's Sons books